The Nepal and Tibet Philatelic Study Circle (NTPSC) exists to promote interest in and the study of the stamps and postal history of Nepal, Tibet, Bhutan and Sikkim. The NTPSC was formed in 1974 as The Nepal Study Circle by Dr. Wolfgang Hellrigl and Colin Hepper with the aim of encouraging the study of stamps and postal history of Nepal. Over the years Tibet was included in the name, while also attention was given to stamps of Bhutan and Sikkim.

The NTPSC publishes a quarterly journal, Postal Himal, and books and monographs relating to these countries. Postal Himal is included
in the Digital Himalaya Project, while the list of contents for each issue can be found on the NTPSC official website.

Publications
 Hellrigl, Wolfgang & Hepper, Colin, The Native Postmarks of Nepal, 1978
 Hepper, Colin, The Sri Pashupati Issues of Nepal
 Hellrigl, Wolfgang, Nepal Postal History
 Hellrigl, Wolfgang & Vignola, Frank, The Classic Stamps of Nepal, 1984
 van der Wateren, Dick, Nepal Postal Stationery 1995
 Hellrigl, Wolfgang, The Postal Markings of Tibet, 1996.
 Hepper, Colin, The Modern Postmarks of Nepal

See also
Postage stamps and postal history of Bhutan
Postage stamps and postal history of Nepal
Postage stamps and postal history of Tibet

References

External links
Official website.

Philatelic organizations
Organizations established in 1974
Philately of Bhutan
Philately of Nepal
Philately of Tibet